These Songs for You, Live!, released in 2004, is a live album compiled from two rare and out-of-print live albums by Donny Hathaway, "Live" and "In Performance".  Additionally, the album includes a number of previously unreleased tracks, a rare interview and the song "Valdez In The Country" from Donny's performance during the Newport Jazz Festival in 1973.

Track listing

References 

Donny Hathaway albums
2004 live albums
2004 compilation albums
Atlantic Records live albums